Isabella Matambanadzo (born 5 June 1973) is a Zimbabwean writer, gender and feminist activist active with the African Feminist Forum. With a background in print, radio and television Journalism, she has used media to amplify women's voices. She also has a background in reporting on breaking news stories in and around Africa having previously worked with Reuters News Agency from 1999 to 2001.

Early life and education 
Isabella Matambanadzo was born on 5 June 1973 to Paul and Creacie Matambanadzo in the industrial suburb of Pelandaba, Bulawayo, Zimbabwe. She is the first of four children. Her early years were spent with her mother and grandmother  who introduced her to feminism. Their family moved to Highfield, Harare, where she attended primary and Secondary School. In 1994 she attained a Diploma from the Zimbabwe Institute of Public Relations and went on to attain a National Diploma in Mass Communications at the Harare Polytechnic in 1995. She graduated from Rhodes University with a summa cum laude BA in Journalism, Literature and Theatre Studies in April 1999.

Career 
From 1999 to 2001, Matambanadzo co-produced, scripted, edited and 156 episodes of the weekly KiSwahili, French and English news features television show Africa Journal for Reuters News Agency.

From 2003 to 2007 she was a member of the United Nations Secretary-General's Task Force on Women, Girls and HIV/AIDS in Southern Africa. Her reports and contributions along with those of other members are collectively published as Facing the Future Together: Report of the United Nations Secretary-General's Task Force on Women, Girls and HIV/AIDS in Southern Africa.

In 2004 and 2006, Matambanadzo was an interviewer, photographer and researcher for Dr Kaori Izumi on Women's Land and Property Rights in Southern Africa. The report was published by the FAO Sub-Regional Office for Southern and East Africa.

From 2004 to 2009, she served as a board member for Radio VOP.  On 24 January 2006, Matambanadzo and five other trustees from Radio VOP Zimbabwe were arrested on charges of operating without a licence. She noted that it was to prevent independent coverage of events in Zimbabwe. At that time, Zimbabwe was undergoing severe political instability and harassment and intimidation of independent press was popular. They were soon released on bail and their hearing was postponed until 25 September 2006, when charges were eventually dropped. Matambanadzo and other members started activism around press freedom. For her work, she was recognized as one of the 11 Front Line Women Human Rights Defenders 2007 by Amnesty International.

Matambanadzo continues to be involved in lobbying for gender and women's rights in areas of displacement, statelessness and child rights. On the issue of modern-day slavery, the Financial Gazette (Zimbabwe) noted that Matambanadzo urged government to escalate diplomatic pressure on Kuwait to account for the whereabouts of every single Zimbabwean woman who had been trafficked to Kuwait. She also has lobbied Zimbabwean government for women's equal participation in politics.

Publications

References 

1973 births
Living people
21st-century Zimbabwean writers
People from Bulawayo
Harare Polytechnic alumni
Rhodes University alumni
WikiGap Harare
Zimbabwean feminists
21st-century Zimbabwean women writers